Ossendrecht is a village in the Dutch province of North Brabant. It is located in the municipality of Woensdrecht, about 12 km southeast of Bergen op Zoom.

The village was first mentioned in 1187 as "Alardus de Ossendreht", and is a combination of ferry / waterway and ox. Ossendrecht developed around a triangular village square.

During the 19th century, Ossendrecht became a centre of cichorium cultivation and processing. Ossendrecht was home to 214 people in 1840. Ossendrecht was a separate municipality until 1997, when it became part of Woensdrecht.

Notable people
 Pauline Musters, recognized by the Guinness Book of World Records as the shortest woman ever recorded, was born here on 26 February 1876.

Gallery

References

Municipalities of the Netherlands disestablished in 1997
Populated places in North Brabant
Former municipalities of North Brabant
Woensdrecht